(lit. "Outline History of Vietnam"), was the first history text published in the Vietnamese language and the Vietnamese alphabet. It was compiled by Vietnamese historian Trần Trọng Kim. It covered the period from Hồng Bàng dynasty to the time of French Indochina. The book was first published in 1920 and reprinted many times. It was the standard history text in South Vietnam. It was often criticised by Communist historians, who argued with Kim's interpretation of the Tây Sơn Rebellion and the reign of Hồ Quý Ly. Both of these were heroes to the Communists, but condemned by mainstream historians.

Background
Since late 19th century, Vietnam became a French colony. Vietnamese emperors were supper rulers of the French and had little actual power. Vietnam was facing an uncertain future. Trần Trọng Kim believed that if the Vietnamese people knew their own history, they would be patriotic and contribute to the growth of Vietnam. 

However, all historical texts were written in Classical Chinese. The use of Classical Chinese (Vietnamese: Hán văn; chữ Hán: 漢文), died out in Vietnam early in the 20th century. Trần Trọng Kim was concerned that if one day most of Vietnamese people could not read chữ Hán, the national history would be forgotten. So, it was necessary to write an outline history in Vietnamese language.

Contents
Việt Nam sử lược contained five parts: 
Early historical period: From Hồng Bàng dynasty to Triệu dynasty;
Period Belonging to the North: From First Chinese domination to the establishment of Ngô dynasty;
Independent period (unified period): Ngô dynasty, Đinh dynasty, Early Lê dynasty, Lý dynasty, Trần dynasty, Lê dynasty;
Independent period (Southern-Northern conflict period): From Mạc dynasty to Tây Sơn dynasty;
Recent and modern period: From Nguyễn dynasty to early 20th century.

References of this book

References

Bibliography

External links

Việt Nam sử lược in Institute of Vietnamese Studies (Viện Việt-Học)
Việt Nam sử lược

Vietnamese history texts
1920 non-fiction books
History books about Vietnam